Ptilocephala plumifera is a moth of the family Psychidae. It is found 
in most of Europe south of the British Isles and Scandinavia, east to the European part of Russia.

There is strong sexual dimorphism in the adults. Males have wings, but females are wingless. Adults are on wing from March to April.

The larvae feed on various grasses and herbs, including Thymus and Calluna and possibly mosses.

External links
microlepidoptera.nl
lepiforum.de

Psychidae
Moths of Europe
Moths of Asia
Moths described in 1810